Eutrachelus temmincki is a species of straight-snouted weevils belonging to the family Brentidae.

Etymology 

Species name honors Coenraad Jacob Temminck (31 March 1778 – 30 January 1858), a Dutch zoologist.

Description 
Eutrachelus temmincki is the largest species in the family Brentidae and has one of the longest snouts among beetles. Body is elongated, with a long snout and more or less developed jaws. The basic color is black with small orange to red spots on the elytra.

Distribution 
This species is present in Indonesia and Malaysia (Borneo, Sumatra, Java, Thailand).

References 

 Wtaxa
  Zin.ru
 Biolib
 Sforzi A, Bartolozzi L. Brentidae of the World (Coleoptera, Curculionoidea). Museo Regionale di Scienze Naturali, 2004 s. 214-215

Brentidae
Beetles described in 1825